The Territorial Enterprise, founded by William Jernegan and Alfred James on December 18, 1858, was a newspaper published in Virginia City, Nevada. Published for its first two years in Genoa in what was then Utah Territory, new owners Jonathan Williams and J. B. Woolard moved the paper to Carson City, the capital of the territory, in 1859. The paper changed hands again the next year; Joseph T. Goodman and Dennis E. McCarthy moved it again, this time to Virginia City, in 1860.

Noted author Mark Twain wrote for the paper during the 1860s along with writer Dan DeQuille. To cover for DeQuille, who took time off to visit his family in Iowa, the young Sam Clemens was hired.  Located steps from the Enterprise offices, Mark Twain and Dan DeQuille, lifelong friends, shared a room at 25 North B St. in Virginia City. 

The paper was owned and operated by the Blake family in the 1890s through the 1920s. 

The paper went out of publication for a while and was revived by Helen Crawford Dorst in 1946 and was later purchased and revived by author, journalist, and railroad historian Lucius Beebe and his long-time companion and co-author Charles Clegg on May 2, 1952. Clegg and Beebe sold the Territorial Enterprise in 1961.

History 
Joseph T. Goodman was owner and editor of the Territorial Enterprise in the 1860s.  He was succeeded by William Sharon who hired Rollin Daggett as managing editor in 1874. Charles Carroll Goodwin joined the staff in 1873, and was chief editor from 1875–1880, before moving on to The Salt Lake Tribune.

Film history 
In 1959 the NBC western television series Bonanza, set in Nevada, aired the episode "Enter Mark Twain", with Howard Duff in the role of the young author who comes to work at the Virginia City Territorial Enterprise.
The Territorial Enterprise also was prominently mentioned in the series State Trooper, in a 1959 episode named "Silver Spiral".

Today 

Thomas Muzzio is president of the Territorial Enterprise Historical and Educational Foundation, which maintains a Web site dedicated to preserving the legacy of the Territorial Enterprise and the history of journalism in the West.

Mark Twain Museum at the Territorial Enterprise

The Mark Twain Museum at the Territorial Enterprise, a separate entity from the above, operates a museum in the original Territorial Enterprise building in Virginia City, NV.  The museum features the original desk used by Mark Twain when he was editor of the paper.  Other exhibits include antique printing presses, an early Linotype machine, a proof press, stone composing tables (one of which Mark Twain and other employees of the paper used to sleep on), and various other antiques.

On April 16, 2019, an edition of the Territorial Enterprise was found in a time capsule from 1872 in the cornerstone of a demolished Masonic lodge in Reno.

Notes

References

External links
Territorial Enterprise Building - includes museum contact, National Park Service
Mark Twain Museum at the Territorial Enterprise - Visit Virginia City, Nevada

A Guide to the 	Enterprise Publishing Company records, NC169. Special Collections, University Libraries, University of Nevada, Reno.

Newspapers published in Nevada
Historic American Buildings Survey in Nevada
History of Storey County, Nevada
Publications established in 1858
Mark Twain
1858 establishments in Utah Territory